St. Louis Cardinal may refer to:

 a member of the St. Louis Cardinals
 St. Louis C2 Cardinal, a series of monoplanes built by the St. Louis Aircraft Corporation